Bang Puleh (also Romanized as Bang Pūleh) is a village in Gerit Rural District, Papi District, Khorramabad County, Lorestan Province, Iran. At the 2006 census, its population was 29, in 5 families.

References 

Towns and villages in Khorramabad County